WNS, or wns, is an acronym for:

 WADP Numbering System, a worldwide reference system for postal stamps
 West Nairobi School, a school in Kenya
 Westside Neighborhood School, Los Angeles
 White nose syndrome, a poorly understood disease of bats
 Windows Notification Service, a service developed by Microsoft for the Microsoft Windows and Microsoft Windows Mobile platforms
 WNS Global Services, a business process outsourcing company
 WNS, the IATA code for Nawabshah Airport, Sindh, Pakistan
 WNS, the National Rail code for Winnersh railway station, Berkshire, UK 
 WNS, the station identifier for the US Storm Prediction Center
 World Netball Series

See also